Charles R. Briggs   (1860–1920) was a 19th-century professional baseball second baseman and outfielder. He played for the Chicago Browns in the Union Association during the 1884 season. In 1888 he played minor league ball in the Central Interstate League and the Tri-State League.

External links

Major League Baseball second basemen
Major League Baseball outfielders
Chicago Browns/Pittsburgh Stogies players
19th-century baseball players
Baseball players from Illinois
1860 births
1920 deaths
Canton Nadjys players
Davenport (minor league baseball) players
People from Batavia, Illinois